Limerick City was a United Kingdom Parliament constituency, in Ireland. It returned one MP 1801–1832, two MPs 1832–1885 and one thereafter. It was an original constituency represented in Parliament when the Union of Great Britain and Ireland took effect on 1 January 1801. It ceased to be represented in the United Kingdom Parliament in 1922.

Boundaries
This was a borough constituency, comprising the parliamentary borough of Limerick in County Limerick. It was south of Clare East but was otherwise surrounded by Limerick East.

Members of Parliament

One member 1801–1832

Two members 1832–1885

Notes:-
 a Resigned.
 b Died.
 c Appointed a Judge of the Irish Court of Queen's Bench.
 d Unseated on petition and new writ issued.
 e Appointed Registrar of Petty Sessions Clerk.

One member 1885–1922

Elections
In 1801–1832 and 1885–1922 the constituency used the first past the post electoral system to fill its one seat. In 1832–1885 the block vote was used to elect two members and first past the post to return one member at by-elections.

Elections in the 1830s

Elections in the 1840s

 

Roche resigned by accepting the office of Steward of the Chiltern Hundreds, causing a by-election.

Elections in the 1850s
O'Connell resigned by accepting the office of Steward of the Chiltern Hundreds, causing a by-election.

 

 

Potter's death caused a by-election.

 

O'Brien resigned after being appointed a judge of the Queen's Bench, causing a by-election.

 

On petition, Gavin was unseated, causing a by-election.

Elections in the 1860s

Elections in the 1870s
Russell's death caused a by-election.

 
 
 
 

Butt's death caused a by-election.

Elections in the 1880s

 

O'Shaughnessy resigned after being appointed a registrar of petty sessions clerk, causing a by-election.

For the 1885 election, the seat was reduced to one MP.

Elections in the 1890s

Daly, who was serving a term of life imprisonment, was elected unopposed after the Official Nationalist candidate (O'Keefe) withdrew in his favour. As a convicted felon, Daly was not eligible to sit in the House of Commons, and the election was declared void.

Elections in the 1900s

Elections in the 1910s

See also
 List of UK Parliament Constituencies in Ireland and Northern Ireland

References

The Parliaments of England by Henry Stooks Smith (1st edition published in three volumes 1844–50), 2nd edition edited (in one volume) by F. W. S. Craig (Political Reference Publications 1973)

Politics of Limerick (city)
Historic constituencies in County Limerick
Westminster constituencies in County Limerick (historic)
Dáil constituencies in the Republic of Ireland (historic)
Constituencies of the Parliament of the United Kingdom established in 1801
Constituencies of the Parliament of the United Kingdom disestablished in 1922